This is a list of the number-one hits of 1992 on Italian Hit Parade Singles Chart.

References

1992
One
1992 record charts